Aleksandar Aleksandrov Tsvetkov (born 31 August 1990) is a Bulgarian professional footballer who plays as a midfielder for Spartak Varna.

Career

Litex
Tsvetkov made his first team debut in a 5–1 Bulgarian Cup win over Maritsa Plovdiv on 7 December 2008, coming on as a substitute for Sandrinho. He made his league debut on 31 May 2009, again as a substitute replacing Wilfried Niflore, as Litex beat CSKA Sofia 1–0.

Tsvetkov became a first-team regular early in the 2012–13 season. On 31 August 2012, he scored his first goal in a 4–0 away league win over Botev Vratsa.

Cherno More
On 9 June 2016 after 10 years in Litex, he left the club and joined Cherno More. He quickly established himself as a regular starter, so it came as a surprise when his contract was terminated by mutual consent in May 2018, several weeks before the end of the season.

Beroe
On 23 June 2018, Tsvetkov signed with Beroe.

International career
On 7 October 2011, Tsvetkov earned his first cap for Bulgaria in the 0–3 away loss against Ukraine in an exhibition match. He had to wait nearly 6 years to feature for the national team again; on 3 September 2017, Tsvetkov was in the line-up for a 2018 FIFA World Cup qualifier, a 1–3 away defeat by the Netherlands.

Career statistics

International stats

International goals
Scores and results list Bulgaria's goal tally first.

Honours
Litex Lovech
 Bulgarian A Group (2): 2009–10, 2010–11
 Bulgarian Cup: 2008–09
 Bulgarian Supercup: 2010

References

External links
 
 

1990 births
Living people
Sportspeople from Pleven
Bulgarian footballers
Bulgaria under-21 international footballers
Bulgaria international footballers
PFC Litex Lovech players
PFC Cherno More Varna players
PFC Beroe Stara Zagora players
First Professional Football League (Bulgaria) players
Second Professional Football League (Bulgaria) players
LPS HD Clinceni players
SSU Politehnica Timișoara players
Liga I players
Liga II players
Association football midfielders
Bulgarian expatriate footballers
Expatriate footballers in Romania
Bulgarian expatriate sportspeople in Romania